The 2000 FedEx Championship Series season was the twenty-second in the CART era of open-wheel racing in the United States. It consisted of 20 races, 
beginning in Homestead, Florida on March 26, 2000 and concluding in Fontana, California on October 30, 2000. The FedEx Championship Series Drivers' Champion was Gil de Ferran. The Rookie of the Year was Kenny Bräck.

The relative decline of Chip Ganassi Racing and an atypical parity among the major engine and chassis builders led to the most wide-open championship race in the history of the series, with seven different winners in the first seven races of the year and 11 drivers winning a race. From 1997–1999, only two drivers came within 50 points of the champion, 9 would do so in 2000.

Penske Racing returned to prominence using Honda engines and abandoning their house chassis for a Reynard 2KI. Gil de Ferran and Helio Castroneves (the latter replacing the deceased Greg Moore), combined for 5 wins, 4 of which were on the road courses the team had not been competitive on in their previous chassis and engine. Veterans Michael Andretti and Paul Tracy, who were 1 and 2 in the championship after the Vancouver round, would fall short after poor finishes down the stretch. Most surprising of all to observers was the return to prominence of Patrick Racing, with veterans Adrian Fernandez and Roberto Moreno finishing second and third respectively in the championship.  

Off the track, while CART remained fiscally strong, anxiety regarding the series' decline in prominence led to the ouster of CEO Andrew Craig at the midpoint of the season, leading to his replacement by Bobby Rahal. The series left open the traditional Indianapolis 500 date of Memorial Day, allowing teams to enter the Indy Racing League sanctioned race for the first time since 1995. Chip Ganassi Racing did so, with their driver Juan Pablo Montoya winning the race handily with purchased IRL equipment. While a competitive triumph for CART, Ganassi's efforts showed the continuing allure of the 500 for CART teams and their sponsors. 2000 would also be the final season for DaimlerChrysler via the Mercedes-Benz brand as an engine manufacturer, after DaimlerChrysler decided to shut down their CART program and coincidentally defected to the NASCAR Winston Cup Series via the Dodge brand in 2001.

Drivers and constructors 
The following teams and drivers competed in the 2000 CART Championship Series season. Five years after the return of Firestone, rival tire manufacturer Goodyear withdrew from CART and its rival the Indy Racing League. So all cars ran on Firestone Firehawk tires. All teams were based in the United States.

Season summary

Schedule 

 Oval/Speedway
 Dedicated road course
 Temporary street circuit

 The Nazareth round was initially scheduled to be the second round on April 9, 2000, but snow caused the race's postponement.

Milwaukee was scheduled to be on June 4, but was postponed due to rain.

Fontana was scheduled for October 29, but during a caution on lap 22 for Cristiano da Matta crashing, rain began to fall and the remainder of the race was postponed to the next day.

Race results

Final driver standings

 Oriol Servià was penalized 4 points for rough driving in Surfers Paradise.

Nation's Cup 

 Top result per race counts towards Nation's Cup.

Chassis Constructor's Cup

Engine Manufacturer's Cup

See also
 2000 Toyota Atlantic Championship season
 2000 Indianapolis 500
 2000 Indy Racing League
 2000 Indy Lights season

References

External links
 Official site & results
 
 Entrant List

Champ Car seasons
CART
CART
 
CART